Little Orphan is a rock hill in the middle of the Yangtze River, located on Susong, Anqing, Anhui province in East China. It is a landmark that frequently written and photographed by many Western travelers along the Yangtze in the second half of the 19th century and the first half of the 20th century. It formed during the quaternary glaciation. The hill is 78 meters above sea level. During the dry season, it would connect with the north bank of the Yangtze and become a peninsula. There is a Buddhist monastery (also a Mazu temple) on the mountainside and a pavilion on the top of the hill. Its name suggests that it stands alone in the river. "Little" makes it different from "Great Orphan" in Poyang Lake. It is classified as an AAA-rated tourist attraction by China National Tourism Administration, attracting tens of thousands tourists and pilgrims every year. Little Orphan has been a frequent subject in the Chinese classic literature, and one travels depicting Little Orphan written by Lu You is selected for the textbook of high school. It appears on the 2016 Chinese film Crosscurrent.

References

External links
 
Official website 
Photos of Little Orphan in 2014

AAA-rated tourist attractions
Landforms of Anhui